Vow of Justice was the second story arc in the Star Wars: Republic comic series (1998–2006). It was included in the last few pages of the last three issues of the Prelude to Rebellion arc.

Synopsis
Shortly after returning to Cerea as a newly knighted Jedi, Ki-Adi-Mundi recalls being chosen for Jedi training and the raiders who terrorized his village. He returns to the Raider camp to confront their chief, only to find him deposed and enslaved. After being beaten and imprisoned, Ki is able to escape and make a show of force, convincing the raiders to disperse.

Issues
Star Wars Republic 4: Prelude to Rebellion, Part 4
Star Wars Republic 5: Prelude to Rebellion, Part 5
Star Wars Republic 6: Prelude to Rebellion, Part 6

Dramatis personae
An'ya Kuro (aka the Dark Woman)
Bin-Garda-Zon
Droe
Ki-Adi-Mundi
Yoda

External links

Comics based on Star Wars